Sandra Choat is a former England women's international footballer. Choat's greatest achievement was winning the 1977 WFA Cup Final.

International career

Sandra Choat made her England debut against France in 1974. In Saturday 19 April 1975, Choat scored a hattrick against Switzerland.

Honours
Q.P.R. 
 FA Women's Cup: 1976–77

References

Living people
English women's footballers
England women's international footballers
Women's association footballers not categorized by position
Year of birth missing (living people)